Masivesi Dakuwaqa (born 14 February 1994) is a Fijian rugby footballer.  Dakuwaqa formerly played rugby sevens for Fiji, including at the 2016 Summer Olympics and rugby league for the Canberra Raiders (Reserve grade) in the National Rugby League. He is currently representing Montpellier in the French Top 14.

Rugby union
Dakuwaqa was born and raised in Wainibuku hart then moved to Nadi district, Fiji and he started his career playing rugby in the local 7's competition on Secala brothers. He played for the Tokatoka Westfield Dragons 7's Team. which is a Saunaka, Nadi-based rugby side that has bred a number of key rugby players for the island nation of Fiji. and Dakuwaqa was selected by Ben Ryan in 2015 to represent the Fiji sevens side, making his debut in the 2016 USA Sevens.
Dakuwaqa returned to rugby union in 2019 playing for Western Force and then signed for Toulon prior to the 2019/20 season.

Rugby league
In May 2017 it was announced Dakuwaqa had switched codes to rugby league where he had signed to the Canberra Raiders in the National Rugby League.

References

External links

 
 
 Zimbio Bio

Fijian rugby sevens players
Living people
Fiji international rugby sevens players
1994 births
I-Taukei Fijian people
Male rugby sevens players
Rugby sevens players at the 2016 Summer Olympics
Olympic rugby sevens players of Fiji
Olympic gold medalists for Fiji
Olympic medalists in rugby sevens
Medalists at the 2016 Summer Olympics
Sportspeople from Nadi
Fijian rugby league players
Rugby league forwards